The 2015 NCAA Men's Water Polo Championship was the 47th annual championship to determine the national champion of NCAA men's collegiate water polo. Tournament matches were played at the Spieker Aquatics Center at UCLA in Los Angeles, California from December 5–6, 2015. UCLA defeated USC for the 2015 title 10–7.

Qualification
Since there has only ever been one single national championship for water polo, all NCAA men's water polo programs (whether from Division I, Division II, or Division III) were eligible. Under the new format, six teams were invited to contest this single-elimination tournament. The play-in games was played December 3, hosted by Southern California, and the championship will be held December 5 and 6, hosted by UCLA.

Bracket
Championship Site: Spieker Aquatics Center, Los Angeles, California

Notes
 Attendance – 1,230 (semifinals, finals)
 All Tournament First Team – Ryder Roberts (Most Valuable Player), UCLA; Blake Edwards, USC; Danny McClintick, UCLA; Luca Cupido, CAL; Mihajlo Milicevic, USC; Anthony Daboub, UCLA; Garrett Danner (Goalie), UCLA

Title game
 The Bruins converted on 4-of-8 power plays while the Trojans were just 2-for-8. Neither team attempted a penalty shot
 Saves: McQuin Baron (USC) 12, Garrett Danner (UCLA) 13

See also 
 NCAA Men's Water Polo Championship
 NCAA Women's Water Polo Championship

References

2015 in American sports
2015 in water polo
2015 in sports in California
NCAA Men's Water Polo Championship